Juan Nogueira (born 1 May 1988) is a Brazilian amateur heavyweight boxer who won a bronze medal at the 2014 South American Games. He competed at the 2013 and 2015 world championships and qualified for the 2016 Summer Olympics.

References

1988 births
Living people
Olympic boxers of Brazil
Boxers at the 2016 Summer Olympics
Brazilian male boxers
Boxers at the 2015 Pan American Games
Sportspeople from São Paulo
South American Games bronze medalists for Brazil
South American Games medalists in boxing
Competitors at the 2014 South American Games
Heavyweight boxers
Pan American Games competitors for Brazil
20th-century Brazilian people
21st-century Brazilian people